Chionophiles are any organisms (animals, plants, fungi, etc.) that can thrive in cold winter conditions (the word is derived from the Greek word chion meaning "snow", and -phile meaning  "lover"). These animals have specialized adaptations that help  them survive the harshest winters.

Polar regions

Arctic animals
Animals such as caribou, Arctic hares, Arctic ground squirrels, snowy owls, puffins, tundra swan, snow geese, Steller's eiders and willow ptarmigan all survive the harsh Arctic winters quite easily and some, like the willow ptarmigan, are only found in the Arctic region.

Antarctic animals 
Antarctica, also known as the southern pole, is larger and can become much colder than the northern pole. As a result, few animals can survive on the mainland of Antarctica, and those that do mostly live near the coast. The few animals that live on the mainland are birds such as Antarctic terns, grey-headed albatross, imperial shag, snowy sheathbill and the most well known inhabitant of Antarctica, penguins. The inhospitable environment helps to deter predators; the few predators that hunt on the mainland, including the south polar skua and the southern giant petrel, mainly prey upon chicks. Most Antarctic predators are found in the polar waters, including the orca and the leopard seal.

Polar adaptations
Normally when colder conditions arrive, animals go into a state of suspended animation called hibernation, when they go into a state of inactivity for long periods of time, which they do not come out of until more suitable conditions for them to survive in arrive. However, when animals live in an environment that is inhospitable for much of the year, then hibernation is not necessary. One of the few animals that does so are lemmings, which have a mass migration after they come out of dormancy. However, most animals living in the arctic  would still be active, even during the most brutal times of winter. Aquatic animals such as Greenland shark, wolf fish, Atlantic cod, Atlantic halibut and Arctic char must cope with the sub-zero temperatures in their waters. Some aquatic mammals, such as walrus, seal, sea lion, narwhals, beluga whales and killer whales, can store fat called blubber that they use to help keep warm in the icy waters. Some ungulates that live in frigid conditions often have pads under their hooves to help have a stronger tension on the icy ground or to help in climbing up on rocky terrain. But mammals that already have a pad under their foot such as polar bears, wolverines, Arctic wolves and Arctic foxes will have fur under their pads to help keep their flesh concealed from the cold. Other mammals such as the musk oxen can keep warm by growing long, shaggy fur to help insulate heat. And this can be quickly shed off when warmer temperatures arrive. But with the snowshoe hare it will change the color of its fur from white to brown or with patches of brown when it sheds off its winter coat. This is to help camouflage itself in its new environment to match with the dirt during the summer or back again when it regrows its longer white fur to match with the snow during the winter.

Mountainous regions

Other chionophiles can be found on or near the equator and yet still live in freezing temperatures. This is mostly due to their geographical range, such as on high altitude mountains where it can reach very cold temperatures and have less oxygen the higher the altitude. These may include the Andes, the Himalayas and the Hindu Kush mountains, where animals such as snow leopards, pumas, wild yaks, mountain sheep, mountain goats, ibex, vicuñas and guanacos can thrive.

Known chionophiles

The following animals are known chionophiles:

 ABC Islands bear
 Adélie penguin
 Alaska marmot
 Alaska moose
 Alaska Peninsula brown bear
 Alaskan hare
 Alaskan tundra wolf
 Antarctic fur seal
 Antarctic petrel
 Antarctic tern
 Arctic fox
 Arctic hare
 Arctic redpoll
 Arctic tern
 Arctic warbler
 Arctic wolf
 Atlantic puffin
 Baird's sandpiper
 Baffin Island wolf
 Barnacle goose
 Barren ground shrew
 Barren-ground caribou
 Bearded seal
 Black guillemot
 Black-bellied storm petrel
 Black-legged kittiwake
 Brown skua
 Buff-breasted sandpiper
 Cape petrel
 Chinstrap penguin
 Common murre
 Crabeater seal
 Crested auklet
 Emperor penguin
 Gentoo penguin
 Glaucous gull
 Great skua
 Greater white-fronted goose
 Grey plover
 Grey seal
 Gyrfalcon
 Harbor seal
 Harp seal
 Heuglin's gull
 Hooded seal
 Iceland gull
 Ivory gull
 Kelp gull
 King eider
 Lapland longspur
 Least auklet
 Lemming
 Leopard seal
 Lesser white-fronted goose
 Little auk
 Little stint
 Long-tailed jaeger
 Macaroni penguin
 Muskox
 Nelson's collared lemming
 Northern collared lemming
 Northern elephant seal
 Northern fur seal
 North American brown lemming
 Pacific golden plover
 Parasitic jaeger
 Peary caribou
 Pectoral sandpiper
 Polar bear
 Pomarine jaeger
 Purple sandpiper
 Red knot
 Red phalarope
 Red-legged kittiwake
 Reindeer
 Ribbon seal
 Ringed seal
 Ross seal
 Ross's gull
 Ruddy turnstone
 Sabine's gull
 Sanderling
 Siberian brown lemming
 Snow bunting
 Snow goose
 Snow petrel
 Snowshoe hare
 Snowy owl
 Snowy sheathbill
 South polar skua
 Southern elephant seal
 Southern fulmar
 Spectacled eider
 Spotted seal
 Steller's eider
 Svalbard reindeer
 Thick-billed murre
 Tundra vole
 Ungava collared lemming
 Walrus
 Weddell seal
 White-rumped sandpiper
 Wolverine
 Yellow-billed loon

See also
 Aquatic animals
 Arboreal locomotion
 List of birds of Antarctica
 Psychrophile
 Troglobite
 Xerocole

References

Animals by adaptation
Fauna of the Arctic